Fushengzhuang railway station is a station of Jingbao Railway in Inner Mongolia, its postal code is 012311. The station was first constructed in 1922 as part of the Tangshan-Baotou railway. The station is under the administration of China Railway Hohhot Group.

See also

List of stations on Jingbao railway

References 

Railway stations in Inner Mongolia